The German Law Journal is a peer-reviewed, online-only open access law journal reporting on the developments in German, European and international jurisprudence. It is published by Washington & Lee University School of Law.

Publication of the journal started in 2000. The journal was co-founded by its editor-in-chief, Russell A. Miller and Peer C. Zumbansen. The journal is published bi-monthly.

On the occasion of its 10th anniversary, the journal was honoured by the German Minister of Justice, Brigitte Zypries, for being an "ambassador of German law".

Special issues 
In addition to its regular monthly publications, from time to time the journal publishes special issues devoted to a particular developing topic in German, European, or international jurisprudence. For example, in the past, the journal published special issues on "The Transnationalization of Legal Education", "The Transnationalization of Legal Cultures", and "Legal Positivism", among others.

References

External links 
 

International law journals
Open access journals
German law journals
Publications established in 2000
Monthly journals
English-language journals
Osgoode Hall Law School
Washington and Lee University
Cambridge University Press academic journals